Sabulilitoribacter multivorans is a Gram-negative, aerobic and rod-shaped bacteria from the genus of Sabulilitoribacter which has been isolated from sand from the South Sea in Korea.

References

External links
Type strain of Sabulilitoribacter multivorans at BacDive -  the Bacterial Diversity Metadatabase

Flavobacteria
Bacteria described in 2014